Wilhelm Emanuel Burgdorf (15 February 1895 – 2 May 1945) was a German general during World War II, who served as a commander and staff officer in the German Army. In October 1944, Burgdorf assumed the role of the chief of the Army Personnel Office and chief adjutant to Adolf Hitler. In this capacity, he played a role in the forced suicide of Field Marshal Erwin Rommel. Burgdorf committed suicide in the Führerbunker on 2 May 1945 at the conclusion of the Battle of Berlin.

Military career 
Burgdorf joined the Prussian Army at the outbreak of World War I as an officer cadet and was commissioned as an infantry officer in Grenadier Regiment 12 in 1915. After the war he served in the Reichswehr and was promoted to captain in 1930. In the Wehrmacht, he became an instructor in tactics at the military academy in Dresden with the rank of major in 1935 and was appointed an adjutant on the staff of the IX corps in 1937. He was promoted to lieutenant colonel in 1938 and served as the commander of the 529th Infantry Regiment from May 1940 to April 1942. In May 1942, he became Chief of Department 2 of the Army Personnel Office. Burgdorf became the Deputy Chief in October 1942, when he was promoted to Generalmajor.

Burgdorf was promoted to chief of the Army Personnel Office and chief adjutant to Adolf Hitler in October 1944. At that time, he was further promoted in rank to Generalleutnant, and one month later (on 1 November 1944) to the rank of General der Infanterie. Burgdorf retained that rank and position until his death. Burgdorf decreed: Every officer and every judge of the Wehrmacht have to act with strongest measures against doubters in the German final victory. "An officer who expresses himself disparaging about the state leadership is intolerable in the National Socialist state."

Role in Rommel's death 
Burgdorf, as part of his function as Hitler's chief adjutant, played a key role in the death of Field Marshal Erwin Rommel. Rommel had been implicated as having a peripheral role in the 20 July plot, an attempt to assassinate Hitler. Instead of bringing the most popular general in Germany before the People's Court, the dictator opted to give Rommel a choice of suicide.

On 14 October 1944, Burgdorf, with General Ernst Maisel, arrived at the Rommel household. Burgdorf informed Rommel of the charges and, following the instructions of Field Marshal Wilhelm Keitel, offered him three choices – report to Hitler to plead not guilty, or admit guilt, take poison, receive a state funeral, and obtain immunity for his family and staff, or face a trial for treason. Rommel decided on the second option and briefed his wife and son. Rommel drove away with Burgdorf and Maisel. Rommel's family received a telephone call 10 minutes later informing them that Rommel had committed suicide.

Battle of Berlin 
Shortly before the Battle of Berlin, Philipp Freiherr von Boeselager overheard Burgdorf say: "When the war is over, we will have to purge, after the Jews, the Catholic officers in the army." Boeselager was a Roman Catholic Wehrmacht officer and vocally objected, citing his own decorations for heroism in combat. He left before Burgdorf answered.

Burgdorf joined Hitler in the Führerbunker when the Soviets assaulted Berlin. On 28 April, Hitler discovered that Heinrich Himmler tried to negotiate a surrender to the western Allies via Count Folke Bernadotte. Burgdorf took part in Hitler's court-martial of Hermann Fegelein, Himmler's SS liaison officer and Eva Braun's brother-in-law. SS-General Wilhelm Mohnke presided over the tribunal, which included SS-General Johann Rattenhuber and General Hans Krebs. Fegelein was so drunk that he was crying, vomiting and unable to stand up; he even urinated on the floor. It was the opinion of the judges that he was in no condition to stand trial. Therefore, Mohnke closed the proceedings and turned Fegelein over to Rattenhuber and his security squad.

On 29 April 1945, Burgdorf, Krebs, Joseph Goebbels, and Martin Bormann witnessed and signed Hitler's last will and testament. After Hitler's suicide on 30 April 1945, Goebbels assumed Hitler's role as chancellor. On 1 May, Goebbels dictated a letter to Soviet Army Marshall Vasily Chuikov, requesting a temporary ceasefire, and ordered General Krebs to deliver it. Chuikov commanded the Soviet forces in central Berlin. After this was rejected, Goebbels decided that further efforts were futile. Goebbels then launched into a tirade berating the generals, reminding them Hitler forbade them to surrender. Ministerialdirektor Hans Fritzsche left the room to take matters into his own hands. He went to his nearby office on Wilhelmplatz and wrote a surrender letter addressed to Soviet Marshall Georgy Zhukov. General Burgdorf followed Fritzsche to his office. There he asked Fritzsche if he intended to surrender Berlin. Fritzsche replied that he was going to do just that. Burgdorf shouted that Hitler had forbidden surrender and as a civilian he had no authority to do so. Burgdorf then pulled his pistol to shoot Fritzsche, but a radio technician "knocked the gun" and the bullet fired hit the ceiling. Several men then hustled Burgdorf out of the office and he returned to the bunker.

After midnight, in the early hours of 2 May 1945, following the earlier suicides of Hitler and Goebbels, Burgdorf and his colleague Chief of Staff Hans Krebs committed suicide together by gunshot to the head. The Soviets found the bodies of Krebs and Burgdorf in the bunker complex.

Awards and decorations
Iron Cross (1914) 2nd Class (24 January 1915) & 1st Class (14 August 1916)
 Knight's Cross of the Royal House Order of Hohenzollern with Swords (27 August 1917)
 Military Merit Cross, 3rd class with war decoration (Austria-Hungary, 27 February 1918)
 Knight's Cross, 2nd class of the Friedrich Order with Swords (18 July 1918)
 Hanseatic Cross of Hamburg (18 October 1918)
 The Honour Cross of the World War 1914/1918 (20 December 1934)
 Wehrmacht Long Service Award 2nd Class (2 October 1936)
 Clasp to the Iron Cross (1939) 2nd Class (15 June 1940)  & 1st Class (17 June 1940)
 Knight's Cross of the Iron Cross on 29 September 1941 as Oberst and commander of Infanterie-Regiment 529

See also 

 Last will and testament of Adolf Hitler
 Downfall, 2004 film where Burgdorf is portrayed by Justus von Dohnányi

References

Explanatory notes

Citations

Bibliography

External links 
 

1895 births
1945 deaths
Critics of the Catholic Church
People from Fürstenwalde
People from the Province of Brandenburg
German Army personnel of World War I
Prussian Army personnel
German Army generals of World War II
Generals of Infantry (Wehrmacht)
Recipients of the Knight's Cross of the Iron Cross
Suicides by firearm in Germany
German Protestants
Nazis who committed suicide in Germany
Recipients of the clasp to the Iron Cross, 1st class
Adjutants of Adolf Hitler
Reichswehr personnel
20th-century Freikorps personnel
1945 suicides
Military personnel from Brandenburg